Somerset Dam is a rural town and locality in the Somerset Region, Queensland, Australia. When first being planned, it was unofficially known as the Stanley River township.

Geography 
The town lies on the slopes of Mount Brisbane on the western bank of the Stanley River immediately below and south-west of the wall of the Somerset Dam which impounds the river creating Lake Somerset.

The Deer Reserve National Park is in the north-west of the locality.

History 
The town was constructed in 1935 to provide accommodation for those working on the construction of the dam and their families with the first businesses opening in 1936. The town was designed by civil engineer Charles Bank Mott like a suburban with gravel streets, electricity, street lights, reticulated water, stormwater drainage, and sewerage. Mott was seconded for three years from the Brisbane City Council.

When the project commenced, the town was informally known as the Stanley River township. The Queensland Government decided to call the town Somerset after local pastoralist Henry Plantagenet Somerset, the Member of the Queensland Legislative Assembly for Stanley from 1904 to 1920. However, the postal authorities objected, fearing confusion with Somerset in Far North Queensland and Somerset in Tasmania. In January 1936 it was officially named Somerset Dam after the dam, which was named after Henry Plantagenet Somerset.

As there was already a Somerset State School near Kilcoy (which had opened in 1915), the education authorities had  decided to call the town's school Silverton. Silverton Provisional School opened in February 1936 at the end of First Avenue. In 1958 it became Silverton State School. Circa 1959 it was renamed Somerset State School (the school of that name near Kilcoy having closed in 1943). On 24 January 1966 it renamed Somerset Dam State School. It  closed on 31 December 2000.

The dam was being built as part of a program of providing employment during the Great Depression. During World War II construction of the dam was halted to enable the workers to be redeployed on war-related work, such as the Cairncross Dockyard with work resuming in 1948. About 450 people were employed constructing the dam during which time the population of the town exceeded 1000 people.

St Mark's Anglican Church at First Avenue was dedicated on 30 August 1936 by Archbishop William Wand. The church building was the former St Mark's Anglican Church of Fernvale which, having closed in 1934, was purchased by the Queensland Government for £50, relocated to Somerset Dam, renovated and re-roofed. The church closed circa 1995. As at 2020, the church building still exists but has been converted to holiday accommodation. 

On the same day and at the same time as the Anglich church was dedicated, so too was St Joseph's Catholic Church at 5 King Street. It was blessed and dedicated by Archbishop James Duhig.

Amenities 
St Joseph's Catholic Church is at 5 King Street. It is part of the Parish of St Mel's at Esk.

References

Further reading

External links 

 

Towns in Queensland
Suburbs of Somerset Region
Localities in Queensland